José Ramon Argüello was the son of Luis Argüello, first native born governor of California,
and María de Soledad Ortega.

Argüello married María Ysabella Alviso and were prominent citizens of Santa Clara.

Born Sept 1829  Alta San Diego

References

Californios
Mayors of San Diego
Year of death missing
People of Mexican California
Year of birth missing